The Lake Wanam rainbowfish (Glossolepis wanamensis) is a critically endangered species of rainbowfish in the  subfamily Melanotaeniinae. It is endemic to Lake Wanam near Lae in Papua New Guinea. It has virtually disappeared from the small lake (2–3 km in diameter) due to competition from introduced, non-native tilapias, but captive populations exist.

Sources

 Ryan Junghenn Aquarium Fish Experts

Lake Wanam rainbowfish
Freshwater fish of Papua New Guinea
Lake Wanam rainbowfish
Lake Wanam rainbowfish
Taxa named by Patricia J. Kailola
Taxonomy articles created by Polbot